Bingsu, sometimes written as bingsoo, is a milk-based Korean shaved ice dessert with sweet toppings that may include chopped fruit, condensed milk, fruit syrup, and red beans. 

The most common variety is pat-bingsu, the red bean shaved ice. The main ingredient of ice was natural ice in the past, but later artificial ice was produced and high-quality sweeteners were developed, and now it has been improved into boiled red bean shaved ice or fruit shaved ice mixed with various fruits. At first, the ice-cutting machine was a simple tool in the shape of a plane, but now the electric power is widely used after a manual rotation by hand.

History 
The earliest forms of bingsu existed during the Joseon dynasty (1392–1897). The government records show that the officials shared the crushed ices topped with various fruits, which were distributed from the ancient Korean ice storage called seokbinggo.  The early forms of patbingsu consisted of shaved ice and two or three ingredients, typically red bean paste, tteok, and ground nut powder. 

The modern versions of the iced desserts were began to be sold in Taegeukdang, the oldest bakery in Seoul that opened in 1946. With the western influences after the Korean War, more various and richer ingredients, such as cereals, syrups, ice creams, or whipped creams, were added to patbingsu.

Varieties
Patbingsu (sometimes anglicized as patbingsoo, literally "red beans shaved ice") is a popular Korean shaved ice dessert with sweet toppings that may include chopped fruit, condensed milk, fruit syrup, and red beans.

The food began as ice shavings with red beans (known as pat). Many varieties of patbingsu exist in contemporary culture.

There are a variety of bingsu types and flavors. Many bingsu do not necessarily follow tradition, and some do not include the red bean paste. Some popular flavors are: green tea, coffee, and yogurt.

In various countries

Korea 
In addition to the existing patbingsu, several Korean franchises have made shaved ice made from various ingredients such as Injeolmi shaved ice, melon shaved ice, coffee shaved ice, and green tea shaved ice. Since the Joseon Dynasty, it was the first time to mix honey and fruit with ice taken from seokbinggo, and after the Korean War, condensed milk, syrup, and chocolate were introduced from the United States and modern "Korean shaved ice" began to be made. Now, bingsu can be found at almost every dessert shop in Korea.

Japan 
In a tea shop in Kagoshima, Shirokuma (the white bear) was made, and the shape of white condensed milk poured over shaved ice in a round bowl and fruits such as sweet red beans, cherries, and tangerines was named after what looked like a white bear's face.

Singapore 
Due to the characteristics of mangoes, mango shaved ice with many mangoes is also famous, as served in a store in Singapore. The "Monster bingsu" is also famous for freezing various flavors of milk, grinding it into layers, and putting chocolate shaped like eyeballs. This variant has shaved ice grounded to show the grain of milk rather than ice with water.

Gallery

See also 
 Korean cuisine
Shaved ice § Regions, for similar shaved ice variations around the world.
Kakigōri: Japanese shaved ice
Tshuah-ping: Taiwanese shaved ice
Halo-halo: Filipino shaved ice (derived from Japanese Kakigori)
Es campur and Es teler: Indonesian shaved ice
Namkhaeng sai and O-aew: Thai shaved ice
Ais Kacang (ABC, Ice Kacang): Malaysian/Singaporean shaved ice
Grattachecca: Italian shaved ice popular in Rome.
Hawaiian shave ice: Hawaiian shaved ice

References

External links 

Ice-based desserts
Korean cuisine
Winter in culture